Paruthiyur K. Santhanaraman is an Indian writer, Pravachan pundit, and former Deputy Treasurer of the Reserve Bank of India. Santhanaraman retired as the Deputy Treasurer of the Reserve Bank of India in Chennai after 40 years of service. He also served as a guest faculty member of the Reserve Bank of India and taught many classes on banking and HRD. Santhanaraman is also a well-known orator and author of several books and numerous articles on Tamil culture.

Contribution to society  
Santhanaraman has been giving religious and literary lectures and speeches on various topics since 1965. He also contributes articles to various magazines. Dr. Santhanaraman has written over thirty five books.

He is married to V. Hema Santhanaraman, an academic. Santhanaraman and Hema have together introduced a new pattern of performing pravachans. They appear together on the platform and speak alternatively in cricket commentary style. This new and unique style attracts the audience.

Santhanaraman has written the book Paruthiyur Stala Purana, describing the temples of Paruthiyur and sons of the soil.  Santhanaraman and his wife have donated money to development projects of the Paruthiyur Temples.

Santhanaraman's article in the October 2006 issue of Ambal Darisanam, under the title "Iruvar Nookil Raman", explains the work of two experts on the Ramayanam, Sri * Periyavaachan Pillai Krishnan of the 13th century and * Paruthiyur Krishna Sastri of the 19th century. Both these experts interpreted the Ramayana's Balakanda sloka " Aham Vedmi Mahathmanam". Periyavachan Pillai wrote more than 10 explanations for the same and Krishna Sastri wrote over 100 explanations on the same sloka. K. Santhanaraman wrote about eighteen Mahaans in his book ‘Arulalargal’ describing their selfless and righteous life dedicated to charity and how their lives had been a guide to humanity.

Works 
His written works include: Some of Santhanaraman’s works include:
Abhirami Anthathi Villaka Perurai, Ambigai Anuboothi, Ambigai Arul Kathaigal,
Annaiyin Peyargal Aayiram, Appar, Arulalargal,
Aru Samaya Vinadi Vina, Dakshinamoorthy Thruvarutpa- Virivurai, Devi Mahatmiyam Ealiya Urai,
Kandapuranam-Vilakkavurai, Kandapuranam – Vasanam, Kandapurana Raghamaligai,
Lalitha Sahasranamam Vilakka Parurai, Malargalil Pootha Malargal, Manikkavasagar,
Mylai Sthala Varalattril Thiruvalluvar, Nalamtharum Natramizh, Nala Charithram,
Narayana Guru, Or Ulagam, Parithiyur Sthala Varalaru,
Panniru Azhvargal Pavaigalum Palliezhuchiyum, Pullal Unarthiya Porul,
Samayamum Samudhayamum, Sambandhar, Saraswathi,
Saraswathi Anthathi Theivurai, Sundarar, Swamimalai Navarathinamalai,
Thiruvizhakkal Nokkamum Payanum, Vedar Kula Thonralgal, Vinai Theerkum Vinayakar,
Vinavum Vilakkamum, Vignanamum Maignanamum

External links
   Sarvam Rama Mayam
   1998 Murukan Conference speakers
   Murukan Conference Participants
   Writer Profiles
 Santhanaraman Books

Indian writers
Writers from Chennai